Yaiskulgee Pakhang Angaoba is a 2011 Indian Meitei language film written and directed by Homen D' Wai. It is produced by Premjit Naoroibam and Kenedy Naoroibam, and presented by Anita Naoroibam. It stars Gurumayum Bonny as the titular protagonist with Bala Hijam in the lead roles. The background score of the film was given by Surmani (Rishi).

Yaiskulgee Pakhang Angaoba was released at Bhagyachandra Open Air Theatre (BOAT), Imphal on 17 December 2011 and screened in different theatres of Manipur in February 2012, including Friends Talkies, Paona Bazar. The film garnered wide critical acclaim upon its release and was a 2012 hit film of Manipur. The line Dashanihe, by Taa Kaboklei Inaocha from the film,  became a symbol of humour and irony till today.

Synopsis
Sanatombi is a studious, simple man from Yaiskul. When he returns home from his school boarding, he crosses path with Majaru, a Kabui girl. Sanatombi falls for her. Taking help from the local men like Kaboklei Inaocha and Kokphai, he transformed himself into Yo Sanatombi just to impress Majaru.

Majaru takes the opportunity and plays with Sanatombi but the latter is completely blinded by love. When he learns the truth on April Fool's day, he suffers from severe depression. With his parents' support and love, he is able to completely recover from it. He does not lose heart and begins to resume his focus on studies. When his hard work and dedication bears fruit, he gives the credit to Majaru. She regrets her past actions and ask Sanatombi for forgiveness.

Cast
 Gurumayum Bonny as Sanatombi
 Bala Hijam as Majaru
 R.K. Sanajaoba as R.K. Sanajaoba, Sanatombi's father
 Star Kamei as Kamei, Majaru's Father
 Heisnam Ongbi Indu as R.K. Tharo Shija, Sanatombi's mother
 Ibomcha as Kaboklei Inaocha
 Gandhi Kangla as Kokphai
 Ritu as Majaru's friend
 Nirupama as Majaru's friend

Accolades
Yaiskulgee Pakhang Angaoba won Best Feature Film Award in 8th Manipur State Film Festival 2013 and 12 other awards including Best Actor, Best Actress and Best Director awards.

Soundtrack
Aphao and Surmani (Rishi) Sharma composed the soundtrack for the film and Homen D' Wai wrote the lyrics. The songs are titled Nakhoi Khulgi Thonggaldani and Nungsi Nangbu Keida Leige. They were among the hit song numbers of 2012.

References

2010s Meitei-language films
2011 films